Dhangadhi F.C. is a Nepalese professional franchise football club based in Dhangadhi, Sudurpashchim Province, that plays in the Nepal Super League (NSL), the top flight franchise football league in Nepal.

In the first season, the club ended the tournament as runners-up, after losing to Kathmandu Rayzers in the final.

History
The club was one of the seven teams to participate in the inaugural NSL season. The name, logo and owner of the club were introduced on 14 March 2021.

Players

2021 squad

References

Football clubs in Nepal
Nepal Super League